Bohdalice-Pavlovice is a municipality in Vyškov District in the South Moravian Region of the Czech Republic. It has about 900 inhabitants.

Administrative parts
The municipality is made up of villages of Bohdalice, Manerov and Pavlovice.

History
The first written mention of Bohdalice is from 1337. Pavlovice was first mentioned in 1371. Manerov was founded in 1785 and later became part of Bohdalice municipality. Bohdalice and Pavlovice were merged into one municipality in 1964.

References

Villages in Vyškov District